Eutopia, meaning "good place", from  (“good” or “well”) and τόπος (“place”), is a more appropriate term for utopia. It also refers to:

 Eutopia (EP), a 2020 extended play by Massive Attack
 "Eutopia" (short story), by Poul Anderson, 1967 
 Eutopian Euphorians, an annual cultural festival organised by Meghnad Saha Institute of Technology
 Festival Eutopía09, where Grupo Yaramá run a workshop on dance and percussion

See also
 Utopia (disambiguation)
 Eutonia, a genus of crane fly in the family Limoniidae
 Eutropia (died after 325), woman of Syrian origin, wife of Emperor Maximian